Donja Stubica is a town in Croatia, about  northeast of Zagreb on the northern slope of Medvednica. It is connected by the state road D307 and L202 railway. The total population is 5,680, with 2,200 people in Donja Stubica itself (census 2011), with a total area of 44.6 km2. It is one of the southern-most towns in the Krapina-Zagorje County, which covers the Hrvatsko Zagorje mountain region north of Zagreb up to the border with Slovenia.

Population

There are 10 settlements in the Town:

 Donja Podgora, population 371
 Donja Stubica, population 2,200
 Gornja Podgora, population 287
 Hižakovec, population 106
 Hruševec, population 388
 Lepa Ves, population 411
 Matenci, population 482
 Milekovo Selo, population 127
 Pustodol, population 844
 Vučak, population 464

History

The town was founded in 1209 by Andrew II of Hungary, during the period of Croatia in the union with Hungary. In 1573 it was a site of the Croatian and Slovenian peasant revolt under the leadership of Matija Gubec.

In the late 19th and early 20th century, Donja Stubica was a district capital in the Zagreb County of the Kingdom of Croatia-Slavonia.

The town has given a number of secular and religious figures. It is also the site of four distinguished archaeological finds. On the basis of this historical importance, Donja Stubica was given a town status in 1997.

Culture
The Kajkavijana association promotes the conservation and advancement of the Kajkavian dialect spoken along the Kupa and Sava Rivers and the cultural heritage of the region. There is also the Culture and Art Society of Stubica and several sporting clubs.

Economy
The outlook for the development of Donja Stubica and its region is in the promotion of small and medium enterprises, trade, and tourism. A number of firms known nationwide are located in Donja Stubica, including Metalis, Hidraulika Kurelja, Trgostil, Frassinox, and Perfa. The town also hosts 3-star hotel complex Terme Jezerčica with wellness and spa facilities.

Notable people
Matija Gubec (around 1548-1573), croatian peasant and the leader of the Croatian–Slovene Peasant Revolt of 1573
Eugen Viktor Feller (1871-1936), pharmacist, entrepreneur and pioneer of the industrial drug production in Croatia. 
Stjepan Steiner (1915–2006), physician, cardiologist, Major general in the Yugoslav People's Army and personal physician of Josip Broz Tito
Lujo Margetić (1920–2010), historian
Željko Matuš (born 1935), football player, Olympic champion and European Championship silver medalist

International relations

Donja Stubica is twinned (twin towns — sister cities) with:
 Rodgau, Hesse, Germany in 2002.

References

External links 

Pictures of Donja Stubica

Cities and towns in Croatia
Populated places in Krapina-Zagorje County
Zagreb County (former)